The 1985 World Series of Poker (WSOP) was a series of poker tournaments held at Binion's Horseshoe.

Preliminary events

Main Event

There were 141 entrants to the main event. Each paid $10,000 to enter the tournament. The 1985 Main Event final table featured two players, Berry Johnston and Hamid Dastmalchi, who would go on to win the Main Event later on their careers.

Final table

Other High Finishes

NB: This list is restricted to top 30 finishers with an existing Wikipedia entry.

External links
Official site

World Series of Poker
World Series of Poker